Juan Falcón may refer to:

 Juan Crisóstomo Falcón (1820–1870), President of Venezuela
 Juan Crisóstomo Falcón National Park, Venezuelan national park
 Juan José Falcón Sanabria (born 1936), Spanish conductor and composer
 Juan Falcón (actor) (born 1965), Cuban actor
 Juan Carlos Falcón (born 1979), Argentine football midfielder
 Juan Falcón (footballer) (born 1989), Venezuelan football striker